The Hogg in Me is compilation presented by American rap label Sick Wid It Records. It was released November 21, 1995 on Sick Wid It and Jive Records. The album was produced by Celly Cel, Damian Law, Dre "Young Dog" Riggins, Filthy Rich, Kevin Gardner, K-Lou, Levitti, Redwine, Stevie Wright and Studio Ton. It peaked at number 36 on the Billboard Top R&B/Hip-Hop Albums. The album features performances by B-Legit, Celly Cel, Levitti, Funk Mobb, The Mossie, Playaz Tryna Strive, A-1 and Reservoir Hoggz.

Background 
Several songs were reproduced on future Sick Wid It releases, including: "Time to Mobb" (It Ain't 4 Play), "Funk Season" (Killa Kali), "Feel Ness Real" (All Frames of the Game), "Can My Nine Get Ate" (The Hemp Museum), "Get a Bar of This Game" (Have Heart Have Money) and "Did Dat" (Paper Chasin'). The song, "Get a Bar of This Game" was slightly altered and retitled to, "Show No Shame", when it appeared on The Mossie's debut album in 1997.

Several new groups were introduced on this compilation that would go on to release albums in 1996–1997, including: Funk Mobb (G-Note, K-1 & Mac Shawn) who released It Ain't 4 Play in 1996, Playaz Tryna Strive (Filthy Rich & T-Pup) who released All Frames of the Game in 1996 and The Mossie (Kaveo, Mugzi & Tap Dat Ass) who released Have Heart Have Money in 1997. Although they appeared on several other Sick Wid It releases from the mid-to-late nineties, A-1 (Big Bone & D-Day) waited almost five years to release their debut album, Mash Confusion was released in the summer of 1999. Reservoir Hoggz (Paulay & Rhythm X) never released an album, although Rhythm X had previously released a solo album in 1994 titled, Long Overdue. Levitti was scheduled to release an album in the late nineties titled, So Fly, although that album never saw the light of day.

Track listing

Charts

Personnel 

 A-1 – Performer
 B-Legit – Performer
 E. Baker – Guitar, Arranger, Keyboards, Producer, Engineer
 Celly Cel – Performer
 Filthy Rich – Producer
 D. Jones – Vocals
 John Kelly – Vocals
 Keba Konte – Photography
 Tim Langford – Vocals
 Levitti – Performer
 The Mossie – Performer
 P.T.S. – Performer
 Redwine – Producer

 Dre "Young Dog" Riggins – Arranger, Programming, Vocals, Vocals (background), Producer
 Lil G Saterfield – Vocals (background)
 Tony Smith – Photography
 D. Stevens – Vocals
 Studio Ton – Performer, Guitar, Arranger, Keyboards, Programming, Producer, Engineer, Mixing
 Suga-T – Performer
 B. Thurmon – Vocals
 The Union – Performer
 S. Wright – Keyboards, Producer
 Young Dog – Performer

References

External links 
[ The Hogg in Me] at Allmusic
The Hogg in Me at Discogs
The Hogg in Me at Tower Records

Albums produced by Studio Ton
Record label compilation albums
1995 compilation albums
Gangsta rap compilation albums
Jive Records compilation albums
West Coast hip hop compilation albums
Sick Wid It Records compilation albums